Madame Aema 9 is a 1993 South Korean film directed by Kim Sung-su. It was the ninth in the Madame Aema series, the longest-running film series in Korean cinema.

Plot
Aema is a bored housewife married to a successful, workaholic businessman. She begins an affair with Jean, a business associate of her husband's. Her husband suspects and begins tormenting Aema, while not letting on that he knows, to protect a business deal. Aema leaves her husband, but is persuaded to return after heeding advice from a friend.

Cast
 Jin Ju-hui: Aema
 Park Gyeol: Jean
 No Hyeon-u: Hyeon-woo
 Gang Seon-yeong: kang-hee
 Yun Bo-ra: Secretary
 Seo Ji-eun: Model
 Hong Chung-gil: Manager

Notes

External links

English

Korean
 
 
 
 

Madame Aema
1993 films
1990s erotic films
1990s Korean-language films
South Korean sequel films